Weston Secondary School is a coeducational secondary school located in the Weston area of Southampton, in the English county of Hampshire.

History
Weston Park Girls' School opened in 1957. Nearby was Weston Park Boys' School, later Grove Park Business and Enterprise College and then in September 2008 closed along with Woolston School Language College to make way for Oasis Academy Mayfield.

It was decided that Weston Park from 1993 the school would admit both boys and girls. The last all girl year group left in 1997 and the school was renamed to Chamberlayne Park Secondary School after the Chamberlayne family who donated the land for the school to be built on. Starting from September 2008 the school was rebranded as Chamberlayne College for the Arts to reflect its specialist status in the Performing Arts.

In 2017 Ofsted judged the school to be Inadequate. After re-inspection in 2018, this judgement was overturned and the school was judged as ‘Requires Improvement’ with leadership aspects judged as ‘Good’.

Previously a foundation school administered by Southampton City Council, in September 2021 Chamberlayne College for the Arts converted to academy status, and was later renamed Weston Secondary School. The school is now sponsored by the Hamwic Education Trust.

Buildings
A number of additional buildings have been added to the school's aging main building. These have tended to be specialist facilities, such as Science labs, Performing Arts studios and Technology workshops

The school was to be completely rebuilt under the Building Schools for the Future programme. The plans included provision for twelve pupils with physical disabilities. A draft plan for the new build was released on 24 October 2009, with the hope work would begin in early 2012. On 5 July 2010 the Secretary of State for Education, Michael Gove, announced that the Building Schools for the Future programme was to be scrapped. BSF projects which had not achieved the status of 'financial close', including Chamberlayne, would not proceed.

The school is currently planning a major re-design, aiming to take place in 2021.

Curriculum

Performing arts
In September 2006 the school became a performing arts school. This means the school gets extra money to spend on Dance, Drama and Music. The school gained an Artsmark award in 2001. In 2004 Ofsted said the school had 'a very strong provision for the performing arts'. From September 2009, the Higher Creative Media Diploma has been available.

Extracurricular activities

 The school has a young carers group.
 Territory Mapping, a 'Future Mapping' careers program.
 Faith and Football Business Enterprise Challenge - in 2008 the school team won the 'Business Drive' award. The 2009 team EnviROM, raised £2000 and won the competition, selling educational environmental discs.
 The school has a radio station accessible through the internet. From September 2008 this was expanded to be a 'real' radio station broadcasting through speakers in the school playground and hall during break times.
 There is a Bullying Intervention Group (BIG) which was involved in an anti-bullying Bullies Aren't Sharp so What's the Point? video.

Rock Challenge
Since 2004, the school has participated in the Southampton heats of Rock Challenge UK.

References

External links
 Weston Secondary school official website

 

Secondary schools in Southampton
Academies in Southampton